Karfamoria  is a town and sub-prefecture in the Kankan Prefecture in the Kankan Region of eastern Guinea. As of 2014 it had a population of 24,858 people.

References

Sub-prefectures of the Kankan Region